Ghar Ki Shobha is a Bollywood film. It was released in 1944. The film was directed by Harshadrai Mehta and Ramesh Saigal. The music was composed by Allahrakha Khan with lyrics by Roopbani. The cast included Karan Dewan, Swaranlata, Jagdish Sethi, Dixit, Yashodhra Katju and Fazlu.

Cast
 Karan Dewan
 Swaranlata
 Jagdish Sethi
 Dixit
 Yashodhra Katju
 Fazlu

Soundtrack
The music director was Allahrakha, and the lyricist was Roopbani. The singers were Rajkumari, Mumtaz, Allahrakha.

Songlist

References

External links
 

1944 films
1940s Hindi-language films
Indian black-and-white films
Films directed by Ramesh Saigal